Dittmer is a rural town and locality in the Whitsunday Region, Queensland, Australia.

History
The locality is named after Felix Dittmer, who bought a gold mine in the area. A town grew up around the mine, but after its liquidation in 1952 it became a ghost town.

Dittmer State School opened on circa 1938 and closed on circa 1952. It was at approx 11 Thorogood Street.

Education 
There are no schools in Dittmer. The nearest government primary and secondary schools are Proserpine State School and Proserpine State High School respectively, both in Proserpine to the north-east.

References 

Towns in Queensland
Whitsunday Region
Localities in Queensland